Alloteropsis semialata, known commonly as black seed grass, cockatoo grass, donkersaad gras, swartsaadgras, tweevingergras, and isi quinti, is a perennial grass distributed across much of tropical and subtropical Africa, Asia and Australia, as well as Papuasia and Madagascar. The genus name Allopteropsis comes from the Greek words "allotrios", meaning "belonging to another", and "opsis", meaning appearance. The specific epithet semialata comes from the Latin "semi" (half) and "ala" (wing), referring to the winged margins of the upper glume.

Description 
This plant typically reaches 20-150 centimeters tall, growing from a short, white rhizome. The leaf blades are typically 10-50 centimeters long and 1-10 millimeters wide. The plant produces 2-flowered fertile spikelets.

Variation 
The species has two subspecies including A. semialata subsp. semialata, which uses the C4 photosynthetic pathway, and A. semialata subsp. eckloniana, which uses the C3 photosynthetic pathway. As the only plant species known to use both pathways, it is an important model for the study of the evolution of photosynthesis. There are a wide range of intermediate phenotypes, including that of C2 photosynthesis. 

The species has been found in a polyploid series with diploid, tetraploid, hexaploid, octoploid and dodecaploid individuals. All members of the C3 subspecies are diploid and there are no diploid individuals outside of that subspecies.

Ecology 
The seeds of this species are an important component of the wet-season diet of many granivorous finches and parrots. The rhizomes are part of the dry-season diet of some animals.

References

Panicoideae
Flora of Africa
Flora of Asia